Spencer Brook may refer to:

 Spencer Brook (New York), a river in Delaware County, New York
 Spencer Brook (Minnesota), a stream in Isanti County, Minnesota
 Spencer Brook Township, Isanti County, Minnesota
 Spencer Brook, Minnesota, an unincorporated community in Spencer Brook Township